Baltic LNG may refer to:

 Baltic LNG, a proposed LNG plant in Russia
 Finngulf LNG, a proposed LNG terminal in Finland
 Klaipėda LNG FSRU, an LNG terminal in Lithuania
 Świnoujście LNG terminal, an LNG terminal in Poland